Old Faithful is a cone geyser in Yellowstone National Park in Wyoming, United States. It was named in 1870 during the Washburn–Langford–Doane Expedition and was the first geyser in the park to be named. It is a highly predictable geothermal feature and has erupted every 44 minutes to two hours since 2000. The geyser and the nearby Old Faithful Inn are part of the Old Faithful Historic District.

History
In the afternoon of September 18, 1870, the members of the Washburn-Langford-Doane Expedition traveled down the Firehole River from the Kepler Cascades and entered the Upper Geyser Basin. The first geyser that they saw was Old Faithful. Nathaniel P. Langford wrote in his 1871 Scribner's account of the expedition: 

In the early days of the park, Old Faithful was often used as a laundry:

Eruptions

More than 1,000,000 eruptions have been recorded. Harry Woodward first described a mathematical relationship between the duration and intervals of the eruptions in 1938. Old Faithful is not the tallest or largest geyser in the park; those titles belong to the less predictable Steamboat Geyser.  The reliability of Old Faithful can be attributed to the fact that it is not connected to any other thermal features of the Upper Geyser Basin.

Intervals between eruptions can range from 60 to 110 minutes, averaging 66.5 minutes in 1939, slowly increasing to an average of 90 minutes apart today, which may be the result of earthquakes affecting subterranean water levels. The disruptions have made earlier mathematical relationships inaccurate, but have actually made Old Faithful more predictable in terms of its next eruption. After the Borah Peak earthquake in central Idaho in October 1983, the eruption intervals of Old Faithful were noticeably lengthened.

The time between eruptions has a bimodal distribution, with the mean interval being either 65 or 91 minutes, and is dependent on the length of the prior eruption.  Within a margin of error of ±10 minutes, Old Faithful will erupt either 65 minutes after an eruption lasting less than  minutes, or 91 minutes after an eruption lasting more than  minutes.

Measurement
Between 1983 and 1994, four probes containing temperature and pressure measurement devices and video equipment were lowered into Old Faithful. Some of the processes observed include fog formation from the interaction of cool air from above mixing with heated air from below, the recharge processes of water entering into the conduit and expanding from below, and entry of superheated steam measuring as high as  into the conduit.

See also
 Strokkur, another naturally-occurring geyser known for erupting frequently and predictably.

Images

References

External links

 
 
 

Geothermal features of Yellowstone National Park
Geysers of Wyoming
Geothermal features of Teton County, Wyoming
Geysers of Teton County, Wyoming
Articles containing video clips